Brendon Walmsley is an Australian singer-songwriter.

In 2011, Walmsley released The Best of Brendon Walmsley, an 18-track collection, including "Remember January", a song commemorating the 2010–11 Queensland floods.

In 2013, Walmsley was cast as "The Phantom" in Andrew Lloyd Webber's hit musical The Phantom Of The Opera in the 2014 Empire Theatre stage show.

Discography

Studio albums

Compilation albums

Awards

APRA Awards
The APRA Awards are held in Australia and New Zealand by the Australasian Performing Right Association to recognise songwriting skills, sales and airplay performance by its members annually.

|-
| 2003
| "Never Never"
| Most Performed Country Work
| 
|-

Country Music Awards of Australia
The Country Music Awards of Australia (CMAA) (also known as the Golden Guitar Awards) is an annual awards night held in January during the Tamworth Country Music Festival, celebrating recording excellence in the Australian country music industry. They have been held annually since 1973.

|-
| 2000
| "Rose & Rodeo" by Brendon Walmsley 
| New Talent of the Year
| 
|-
| 2001
| "Last of the Big Gun Drovers" by Brendon Walmsley 
| Heritage Song of the Year
| 
|-
| 2002
| "Never Never" by Brendon Walmsley
| Heritage Song of the Year
|

Tamworth Songwriters Awards
The Tamworth Songwriters Association (TSA) is an annual songwriting contest for original country songs, awarded in January at the Tamworth Country Music Festival. They commenced in 1986.  Brendon Walmsley has won five awards.
 (wins only)
|-
| 2000
| "Rose and Rodeo" by Brendon Walmsley
| New Songwriter Award
| 
|-
| 2001
| "Last of the Big Gun Drovers" by Brendon Walmsley
| Traditional Bush Ballad of the Year
| 
|-
|rowspan="2"|  2005
| "Patches" by Brendon and Judy Walmsley and Graeme Watt
| Contemporary Song of the Year
| 
|-
| "Bottle Tree Lane" by Brendon Walmsley
| Country Ballad of the Year
| 
|-
| 2008
| "When God Takes a Photograph" by Brendon Walmsley with Merelyn and David Carter
| Gospel Song of the Year
| 
|-

Current Work 
Brendon is currently working as a Pastor at HumeRidge Church of Christ in Toowoomba.

References

Australian country singers
21st-century Australian male singers
Living people
Year of birth missing (living people)